Ethan Carter may refer to:
 Ethan Carter, a character in The Vanishing of Ethan Carter, a 2014 suspense video game
 Ethan Carter III, an American professional wrestler